Brian Leslie Macready (25 March 1942 – 2017) was an English professional footballer who played in the Football League for Mansfield Town and West Bromwich Albion.

References

1942 births
2017 deaths
English footballers
Association football forwards
English Football League players
Hull City A.F.C. players
Mansfield Town F.C. players
West Bromwich Albion F.C. players
Worcester City F.C. players
Banbury United F.C. players